Dean Young (born 7 January 2002) is a Scottish professional snooker player.

Career
Young went to Firrhill High School and has been playing since the age of seven.  He is based at the Locarno Snooker Club in Edinburgh.

He won the U-21 Scotland National Snooker Championship in 2018 and 2019 defeating Aaron Graham on both occasions.

In June 2021, Young came through Q-School - Event 3 defeating Florian Nüßle and Mitchell Mann amongst others, before beating Haydon Pinhey 4–1 in the final round to earn a two-year card on the World Snooker Tour for the 2021–2022 and 2022–2023 seasons. He was the only rookie from that year's Q-School.

Performance and rankings timeline

Career finals

Amateur finals: 2 (1 title)

References

Scottish snooker players
2002 births
Living people
Sportspeople from Edinburgh